WTUA (106.1 FM) is a radio station broadcasting an urban gospel format. Licensed to St. Stephen, South Carolina, United States.  The station is currently owned by Praise Communications, Inc. and has a permit to move to 105.9 FM.

WTUA is part of the Glory Radio Network along with WLJI, WPDT and WSPX.

See also
List of radio stations in South Carolina

References

External links

Gospel radio stations in the United States
TUA
Radio stations established in 1975